Jon Courtenay Grimwood (born 1953 in Valletta, Malta) is a Maltese born British science fiction and fantasy author. He also writes literary fiction as Jonathan Grimwood, and crime fiction and thrillers as Jack Grimwood.

Biography
Grimwood was born in Valletta, Malta, grew up in Malta, Britain, Southeast Asia and Norway in the 1960s and 1970s. He studied at Kingston University, then worked in publishing and as a freelance writer for magazines and newspapers including The Guardian, The Daily Telegraph, The Times, and The Independent. Now writing a memoir and studying for a PhD at the University of St Andrews, he lives in Edinburgh and is married to the journalist and novelist Sam Baker, with a son, Jamie, from a previous marriage.

Much of his early work within SF&F has been described as post-cyberpunk.
 He won a British Science Fiction Association award for Felaheen in 2003, was short-listed for the Arthur C. Clarke Award for Pashazade the year before, and won the 2006 BSFA award for Best Novel with End of the World Blues. He was short-listed for the John W. Campbell Memorial Award in 2002 for Pashazade. His fourth book is loosely based on Stanley Weyman's Victorian novel Under the Red Robe. End of the World Blues was also short-listed for the 2007 Arthur C. Clarke Award.
The following were nominated in the SF novel category in the Locus Awards – Felaheen, The Third Arabesk (2004); Stamping Butterflies (2005); 9Tail Fox (2006); End of the World Blues (2007).

Grimwood's SF&F work tends to be of a quasi-alternate history genre. In the first four novels, set in the 22nd century, the point of divergence is the Franco-Prussian War of 1870, where Grimwood posits a reality where Napoleon III's France defeats Otto von Bismarck's Prussia, causing the German Empire never to form and the Second French Empire never to collapse. In the Arabesk trilogy, the point of divergence is in 1915, with Woodrow Wilson brokering an earlier peace so that World War I barely expanded outside of the Balkans; the books are set in a liberal Islamic Ottoman North Africa in the 21st century, mainly centring on El Iskandriya (Alexandria). By contrast, there is little in Stamping Butterflies, 9tail Fox or End of the World Blues to suggest that the books are not set in our reality.

The Fallen Blade is the first of three novels set in an alternative early-15th century featuring Tycho, fallen angel and assassin, at the Venetian court, in a Venice where Marco Polo's family have been hereditary dukes for five generations and the Mongol emperor Tamberlaine has conquered China, making him the most powerful ruler in the world. The second novel in the Assassini series, The Outcast Blade was published in 2012, with the third The Exiled Blade published 2013. The novels take as a template sequences and tropes from Shakespeare's plays Othello, Hamlet and Romeo and Juliet. The novels have been sold into a number of languages.

His first literary novel, The Last Banquet, as Jonathan Grimwood, was published in 2013 by Canongate Booksin the UK, Europa Editions in the US, and Éditions Terra Nova in France, among others. Referencing Benjamin Franklin, Voltaire and the Marquis de Sade — and picaresque in the style of Candide — it tells the semi magic realist tale of an aristocrat prepared to eat anything, and covers the run up to the French Revolution from the early to late 18th century. The French France 5 critic Gérard Collard called Le Dernier Banquet "" (the book of the year). It was an NPR Best Book of the Year for 2013 'Foodies and Francophiles alike will relish this debut novel about Jean-Marie d'Aumout, whom we first meet crunching beetles as a starving orphaned son of nobility in 1723...’ In January 2015 it was shortlisted for Le Prix Montesquieu. The book was also nominated for the Bad Sex Awards for a scene involving Brie and breast milk.

As Jack Grimwood, he is writing thrillers for Penguin Books. The first, Moskva, Spring 2016, is set in 1980s Soviet Moscow. The second, Nightfall Berlin was published in May 2018.

2021’s Island Reich, the first stand-alone novel written as Jack Grimwood, mixes the story of the fictional safe cracker and conman Bill O’Hagan, with the Battle of France in June 1940, the German occupation of the Channel Islands, the Duke of Windsor’s exile in Portugal and Operation Willi, the supposed Nazi plot to kidnap the duke and return him to the British throne as a puppet monarch. 

Midnight Sun, the third Tom Fox novel, is due Summer 2023. 

Grimwood was guest of honour at Novacon in 2003, at Kontext (in Uppsala, Sweden) in 2008, at Eastercon LX (the 60th British National Science Fiction Convention) in 2009, and at Bristolcon in 2014.

He was a judge for the 2010 Arthur C Clarke Award presented to China Miéville for The City & the City; and for the 2011 award presented to Lauren Beukes for Zoo City. He also judged The James White Award given at Eastercon 2012.

Novels

References

External links

 
 
 Grimwood SF Encyclopedia entry
 Interview with the author on SFsite.com, April 2002
 Interview with the author on StrangeHorizons.com, 12 August 2002
 Interview with the author on Infinity Plus, August 2006
 Review of 9tail Fox from The Future Fire, December 2005
 Review of The Exiled Blade from Upcoming4.me, May 2013

1953 births
Living people
British alternative history writers
British science fiction writers
British horror writers
People from Valletta
British male novelists